Sipopo is a resort town located in the province of Bioko Norte of Equatorial Guinea.

History
Sipopo was inaugurated on 5 June 2011.

Geography
Sipopo the northeastern part of the island of Bioko. It contains a 200-room hotel run by the Sofitel hotel chain, Sofitel Malabo Sipopo Le Golf.

References

Populated places in Bioko Norte
Bioko